This is a list of museums in Japan.

As of October 2018, there were 5,738 museums in Japan. This total comprises, in line with the Museum Act, 914 registered museums, 372 designated museum-equivalent facilities, and 4,452 museum-like facilities.

By region and prefecture

Hokkaidō

Registered museums 
As of 1 November 2019, and in line with the Museum Act, there were forty-five registered museums in Hokkaidō:
 Abashiri City Folk Museum
 Abashiri City Museum of Art
 Abashiri Prison Museum
 Akkeshi Maritime Affairs Memorial Museum
 Arai Memorial Museum of Art
 Asahikawa City Museum
 Asahikawa Museum of Sculpture in Honour of Nakahara Teijirō
 Asahikawa Science Center
 Bihoro Museum
 Date City Museum of History and Culture
 Hakodate City Museum
 Hakodate Jōmon Culture Center
 Hakodate Museum of Art, Hokkaidō
 Hidaka Mountains Museum
 Hiroo Town Marine Museum
 Hokkaidō Asahikawa Museum of Art
 Hokkaidō Museum of Literature
 Hokkaidō Museum of Modern Art
 Hokkaidō Museum of Northern Peoples
 Hokkaidō Obihiro Museum of Art
 Kan Yasuda Sculpture Museum – Arte Piazza Bibai
 Kitaichi Venetian Art Museum
 Kitami Region Museum of Science History and Art
 Kushiro Art Museum, Hokkaidō
 Kushiro City Museum
 Kushiro City Museum of Art
 Migishi Kōtarō Museum of Art, Hokkaidō
 Mikasa City Museum
 Miura Ayako Literature Museum
 Monbetsu City Museum
 Mukawa Town Hobetsu Museum
 Nayoro City Kitaguni Museum
 Nibutani Ainu Culture Museum
 Obihiro Centennial City Museum
 Otaru City General Museum
 Otaru City Museum of Art
 Otaru City Museum of Literature
 Rishiri Town Museum
 Sapporo Science Center
 Shibetsu City Museum
 Shinhidaka Town Museum
 Tomakomai Art Museum
 Tomakomai City Science Center
 Urakawa Town Museum
 Shiretoko Museum

Designated museum-equivalent facilities 
As of 10 February 2015, in line with the Museum Act, there were twenty-one designated museum-equivalent facilities in Hokkaidō:
 Akkeshi Marine Station Field Science Center for Northern Biosphere, Hokkaidō University
 Asahikawa Tondenhei Village Museum
 Chitose Salmon Aquarium
 Field Science Center for Northern Biosphere, Hokkaidō University
 Fukuhara Memorial Museum
 Historical Village of Hokkaidō
 Hongō Shin Memorial Museum of Sculpture, Sapporo
 Kushiro Children's Museum
 Lake Utonai Sanctuary Nature Center
 Muroran City Youth Science Museum
 Muroran Folklore and Historic Museum
 Nemuro City Museum of History and Nature
 Noboribetsu Marine Park Nixe
 Noboribetsu Bear Park
 Obihiro Zoo
 Otaru Aquarium
 Sapporo Art Museum
 Sapporo Maruyama Zoo
 Sendai Clan, Shiraoi Manor House Museum
 Kanda Nisshō Memorial Museum of Art
 Yūbari Coal Mine Museum

Museum-like facilities, etc 
These include:
 Chūrui Naumann Elephant Museum
 Edwin Dun Memorial Museum
 Ebetsu City Historical Museum
 Ebetsu Glass Crafts Museum
 Eniwa City Historical Museum
 Esashi Town Historical Museum
 Hakodate City Museum of Literature
 Hakodate City Museum of Northern Peoples
 Historical Museum of the Saru River
 Hokkaidō Archaeological Operations Center
 Hokkaidō Museum
 Hokkaidō Railway Technology Museum
 Hokkaidō University Botanical Gardens
 Hokkaidō University Museum
 Hokuchin Memorial Museum
 Hokuto City Hometown Museum
 Ishikari City Hamamasu Folk Museum
 Kayano Shigeru Nibutani Ainu Museum
 Kikonai Town Museum
 Kitami Mint Memorial Museum
 Matsumae Town Historical Museum
 Miyanomori Art Museum
 Museum of Soils and Ploughs of the World
 Nanae Historical Museum
 National Ainu Museum
 Okhotsk Museum Esashi
 Otaru Music Box Museum
 Pierson Memorial House
 Rausu Municipal Museum
 Rebun Town Historical Museum
 Sapporo Beer Museum
 Sapporo Buried Cultural Property Center
 Shellfish Museum of Rankoshi
 Shibetsu Salmon Science Museum
 Shinhidaka Ainu Museum
 Shintotsukawa Town Historical Museum
 Taiho Sumo Museum
 Takikawa Local History Museum
 Takikawa Museum of Art and Natural History
 Urahoro Town Museum
 Wakkanai Karafuto Museum
 Yakumo Town Museum
 Yasushi Inoue Memorial Hall
 Yoichi Fisheries Museum

Former museums 
Former museums include:
 Ainu Museum

Tōhoku

Aomori Prefecture

Registered museums
As of 31 March 2020, in line with the Museum Act, there were three registered museums in Aomori Prefecture:
 Aomori Prefectural Museum
 Hachinohe City Museum
 Hirosaki City Museum

Designated museum-equivalent facilities
As of 31 March 2020, in line with the Museum Act, there was one designated museum-equivalent facility in Aomori Prefecture:
 Aomori Museum of Art

Museum-like facilities
As of 31 March 2020, and as listed by the Aomori Prefectural Government, there were eighty-four museum-like facilities in Aomori Prefecture, including:
 Aomori City Forestry Museum
 Aomori City Mediaeval Museum (Chūsei no Yakata)
 Aomori Museum of History
 Hakkōda Mountains Incident Museum
 Hirosaki Castle Botanical Gardens
 Hirosaki Castle Museum
 Hirosaki City Local Literature Museum
 Korekawa Archaeological Institution (Korekawa Jōmon Kan)
 Kushihiki Hachiman-gū Museum of National Treasures
 Dazai Osamu Memorial Museum
 Misawa Aviation & Science Museum
 Munakata Shikō Memorial Museum of Art
 Sanmaru Museum
 Takayama Uichi Memorial Museum of Art
 Terayama Shūji Memorial Museum
 Takaoka no Mori Historical Museum of Hirosaki Clan
 Towada Art Center
 Tsugaru-han Neputa Village
 Tsugaru Kokeshi Museum

Other related facilities
 Andō Shōeki Museum
 Nebuta Museum Wa Rasse
 Nitobe Memorial Museum
 Tachineputa Museum

Former museums
 Hachinohe City Museum of Art

Iwate Prefecture

Registered museums & designated museum-equivalent facilities
 Goshono Jōmon Museum
 Hanamaki City Museum
 Hekishōji Museum
 Iwate Museum of Art
 Iwate Prefectural Museum
 Kitakami City Museum
 Miyazawa Kenji Memorial Museum
 Ōfunato City Museum
 Ōshū City Cattle Museum
 Tōno City Museum

Museum-like facilities, etc
 Hachimantai City Museum
 Satō Hachirō Memorial Museum
 Hanamaki City Museum of History and Folklore
 Hara Kei Memorial Museum
 Ichinoseki City Museum
 Ishikawa Takuboku Memorial Museum
 Kikuta Kazuo Memorial Museum
 Michinoku Folk Village
 Mifune Kyūzō Memorial Museum
 Morioka History and Culture Museum
 Stone and Kenji Museum
 Toneyama Kōjin Memorial Art Museum
 Tōno Folktale Museum

Miyagi Prefecture

Registered museums & designated museum-equivalent facilities
 Aoba Castle Museum
 Fukushima Art Museum
 The Miyagi Museum of Art
 Ōsaki City Matsuyama Furusato History Museum
 Rias Ark Museum of Art
 Rikuzentakata City Museum
 Sendai City Museum
 Kami Town Serisawa Chōsuke Tōhoku Ceramic Culture Museum
 Tōhoku Gakuin University Museum
 Tōhoku History Museum
 Tōhoku Fukushi University Serizawa Keisuke Art and Craft Museum
 Zuigan-ji Treasure Hall Seiryūden

Museum-like facilities, etc
 3M Sendai Science Museum
 Bansui Sōdō
 Botanical Garden of Tōhoku University
 Daigigakoi Shell Mound Museum
 Fujita Kyōhei Museum of Glass
 Hara Asao Memorial Museum
 Ishinomori Manga Museum
 Ishinomori Shōtarō Furusato Memorial Museum
 Kankaku Museum
 Kanno Museum of Art
 Kanrantei & Matsushima Museum
 Kazenosawa Museum
 Kesennuma City Ōtani Mine History Museum
 Museum of Kamei Collection
 Nakamoto Seishi Contemporary Art Museum
 Ōhira-mura Furusato Museum of Art
 Police Museum
 Saitō Garden Museum
 Sannō-Gakoi Site Museum
 Satohama Shell Mound & Historical Museum of Jōmon Village, Oku-Matsushima
 Satoru Satō Art Museum
 Sendai Astronomical Observatory
 Sendai City Tomizawa Site Museum
 Sendai City War Reconstruction Memorial Hall
 Sendai City Wild Plants Garden
 Sendai Kaleidoscope Museum
 Sendai Literature Museum
 Shiogama Jinja Museum
 Shiogama Sugimura Jun Museum of Art
 Tanabata Museum
 Tōhoku University Museum
 Tome City History Museum
 Toyoma Education Museum
 Zuihōden Museum

Akita Prefecture

Registered museums & designated museum-equivalent facilities
 Akita Museum of Art
 Akita Museum of Modern Art
 Akita Prefectural Museum
 Akita Senshū Museum of Art
 Kitaakita City Hamabe no Uta Music Hall
 Kosaka Town Museum
 Omono River Local Museum
 Polder Museum of Ōgata-Mura

Museum-like facilities, etc
 Mining Museum of Akita University
 Ōmura Museum of Art
 Satake Historical Museum
 Yokote Masuda Manga Museum

Yamagata
 Abumiya
 Chidō Museum
 Chidōkan (Tsuruoka)
 Dewazakura Museum of Art
 Domon Ken Photography Museum
 Homma Museum of Art
 Kaminoyama Castle
 Matsuoka Kaikonjo
 Mogami Yoshiaki Historical Museum
 Sakata City Museum of Art
 Yamadera Basho Memorial Museum
 Yamagata Museum of Art
 Yamagata Prefectural Museum
 Yonezawa City Uesugi Museum

Fukushima
 Aizuwakamatsu Castle
 Fukushima Museum
 Fukushima Prefectural Museum of Art
 Iwaki City Archaeological Museum
 Kōriyama City Museum of Art
 Morohashi Museum of Modern Art
 Picture Book Museum, Iwaki City
 Takizawa Honjin

Kantō

Ibaraki
 Ibaraki Prefectural Museum of History
 Science Museum of Map and Survey
 Tenshin Memorial Museum of Art, Ibaraki

Tochigi
 Bandai Museum
 Honda Collection Hall
Kurita Museum
Utsunomiya Museum of Art
Tochigi Prefectural Museum
Tochigi Prefectural Museum of Fine Arts

Gunma
 Asama Volcano Museum
 Gunma Insect World
 The Museum of Modern Art, Gunma
 Okawa Museum of Art
 Usui Pass Railway Heritage Park

Saitama
 Hachigata Castle
 John Lennon Museum
 Railway Museum (Saitama)
 Saitama Prefectural Museum of the Sakitama Ancient Burial Mounds
 Tokorozawa Aviation Museum

Chiba
 Chiba Museum of Science and Industry
 Hoki Museum
 Kawamura Memorial DIC Museum of Art
 Kururi Castle
 National Museum of Japanese History
 Ōtaki Castle (Chiba)
 Sekiyado Castle
 Tateyama Castle

Tokyo

Kanagawa
 Hakone Open-Air Museum
 Hara Model Railway Museum
 Japan Coast Guard Museum Yokohama
 Japanese battleship Mikasa
 Kamakura Museum of Literature
 Kamakura Museum of National Treasures
 Kanazawa Bunko
 Lalique Museum Hakone
 Museum of Tin Toys
 Nihon Minka-en
 Nissan Engine Museum
 Number Nine Research Laboratory
 NYK Maritime Museum
 Odawara Castle
 Pola Museum of Art
 Shin-Yokohama Raumen Museum
 Taro Okamoto Museum of Art
 Toshiba Science Institute
 Yamate Museum
 Yokohama Archives of History
 Yokohama Customs Museum
 Yokohama History Museum
 Yokohama Museum of Art
 Yokohama Port Museum
 Yokohama Science Center
 Yokohama Silk Museum

Chūbu

Niigata
 Former Niigata Customs House
 Niigata City History Museum
 Niigata Prefectural Museum of History
 Northern Culture Museum

Toyama
 Museum of Modern Art, Toyama
 Toyama Castle

Ishikawa
 21st Century Museum of Contemporary Art
 Ishikawa Aviation Plaza
 Ishikawa Nanao Art Museum
 Ishikawa Prefectural History Museum
 Ishikawa Prefectural Museum of Art
 Ishikawa Prefectural Museum of Traditional Arts and Crafts
 Kanazawa Phonograph Museum
 Kanazawa Yasue Gold Leaf Museum
 Kanazawa Yuwaku Yumeji-kan Museum
 Murō Saisei Memorial Museum
 Nippon Origami Museum

Fukui
 Brief Messages from the Heart Museum
 Fukui Fine Arts Museum
 Fukui Prefectural Dinosaur Museum
 Fukui Prefectural Museum of Cultural History
 Fukui Prefectural Varve Museum
 Maruoka Castle
 Port of Humanity Tsuruga Museum
 Wakasa Mikata Jōmon Museum

Yamanashi
 Kiyosato Museum of Photographic Arts
 Maizuru Castle Park
 Nakamura Keith Haring Collection
 Yamanashi Prefectural Museum
 Yamanashi Science Museum

Nagano
 Hijiri Museum
 Japan Ukiyo-e Museum
 Jōkyō Gimin Memorial Museum
 Kaichi School Museum
 Kitano Museum of Art
 Lake Nojiri Naumann Elephant Museum
 Matsumoto Castle
 Matsushiro Literary and Military School
 Saku Children's Science Dome for the Future
 Sunritz Hattori Museum of Arts
 Togariishi Museum of Jōmon Archaeology

Gifu
 Cormorant Fishing House
 Eizō & Tōichi Katō Memorial Art Museum
 Enkū Museum
 Gifu Castle
 Gifu City Museum of History
 Gifu City Science Museum
 Gifu Prefectural Museum
 Hida Minzoku Mura Folk Village
 Hikaru Memorial Hall
 Museum of Fine Arts, Gifu
 Nawa Insect Museum
 Ōgaki Castle
 Ōta-juku Nakasendō Museum
 Solar Ark
 Sunomata Castle

Shizuoka
 Arai Barrier
 Hamamatsu Castle
 Kakegawa Castle
 MOA Museum of Art
 Sano Art Museum
 Shijimizuka site
 Shizuoka Prefectural Museum of Art
 Toi Gold Museum
 Uehara Museum of Modern Art
 Yokosuka Castle

Former museums
 Sakuma Rail Park

Aichi
 Aichi Arts Center
 Aichi Prefectural Ceramic Museum
 Bank of Tokyo-Mitsubishi UFJ Money Museum
 Electricity Museum, Nagoya
 Inuyama Castle
 International Design Centre Nagoya
 Iwasaki Castle
 Japan Spinning Top Museum
 Kiyosu Castle
 Koromo Castle
 Little World Museum of Man
 Masamura Pachinko Museum
 Meiji Mura
 Nagoya Castle
 Nagoya City Art Museum
 Nagoya City Museum
 Nagoya City Science Museum
 Nagoya City Tram & Subway Museum
 Nagoya Noh Theater
 Nagoya/Boston Museum of Fine Arts
 Nishio Castle
 Noritake Garden
 Okazaki Castle
 SCMaglev and Railway Park
 Tahara Castle
 Tokugawa Art Museum
 Toyohashi City Museum Art and History
 Toyota Automobile Museum
 Toyota Commemorative Museum of Industry and Technology
 Toyota Municipal Museum of Art
 Yoshida Castle

Kansai

Mie
 Iga Ueno Castle
 Iga-ryū Ninja Museum
 Natsumi Temple complex
 Saikū

Shiga
 Hikone Castle
 Kawara Museum
 Miho Museum
 Minakuchi Castle
 Nagahama Castle
 Sagawa Art Museum

Kyoto
 Asahi beer Oyamazaki Villa Museum of Art
 Fukuchiyama Castle
 Kyoto Art Center
 Kyoto City History Museum
 Kyoto International Manga Museum
 Kyoto Municipal Museum of Art
 Kyoto Museum for World Peace
 Kyoto National Museum
 National Museum of Modern Art, Kyoto
 Ōkōchi Sansō
 Ryozen Museum of History
 Sen-oku Hakuko Kan
 The Tale of Genji Museum
 Umekoji Steam Locomotive Museum

Osaka
 Abeno Harukas Art Museum
 CupNoodles Museum Osaka Ikeda
 Fujita Art Museum
 Itsuō Art Museum
 Kishiwada Castle
 Kubosō Memorial Museum of Arts, Izumi
 Liberty Osaka
 Masaki Art Museum
 Modern Transportation Museum
 Momofuku Ando Instant Ramen Museum
 Museum of Oriental Ceramics, Osaka
 National Museum of Art, Osaka
 National Museum of Ethnology (Japan)
 Osaka Castle
 Osaka City Museum of Fine Arts
 Osaka Contemporary Art Center
 Osaka International Peace Center
 Osaka Maritime Museum
 Osaka Museum of History
 Osaka Museum of Natural History
 Osaka Prefectural Chikatsu Asuka Museum
 Osaka Science Museum
 Sakai City Museum
 Yuki Museum of Art

Former museums
 Osaka City Museum

Hyōgo
 Hakutsuru Fine Art Museum
 Hyōgo Prefectural Museum of Art
 Kobe Anpanman Children's Museum & Mall
 Kobe City Museum
 Kobe City Museum of Literature
 Kobe Maritime Museum
 Takenaka Carpentry Tools Museum

Nara

Registered museums
There are fourteen registered museums:
 The City Museum of Gojō Culture
 Daiki Osyou Folk Craft Museum
 Kashiba Municipal Nijōsan Museum
 Kashihara City Museum of History
 Kashihara City Museum of Insects
 Kasuga Taisha Kokuhōden
 Kasuga Taisha Manyō Botanical Garden
 Katsuragi City History Museum
 Kita Museum of Art
 The Museum, Archaeological Institute of Kashihara, Nara Prefecture
 Nakano Museum of Art
 Neiraku Museum
 Shōhaku Art Museum
 Suiheisha Museum

Museum-equivalent facilities
There are six museum-equivalent facilities:
 Hōryū-ji Daihōzōden
 The Museum of Tezukayama University
 The Museum Yamato Bunkakan
 Nara University Museum
 Takamatsuzuka Mural Hall
 Tenri University Sankōkan Museum

Other museums and museum-like facilities
 Asuka Historical Museum
 Irie Taikichi Memorial Museum of Photography Nara City
 Karako-Kagi Archaeological Museum
 Nara City Historical Materials Preservation House
 Nara Municipal Buried Cultural Properties Research Centre
 Nara National Museum
 Nara Palace Site Museum
 Nara Prefecture Complex of Man'yo Culture
 Nara Prefectural Museum of Art
 Nara Prefectural Museum of Folklore
 Tomimoto Kenkichi Memorial Museum

Wakayama
 Kushimoto Turkish Memorial and Museum
 Wakayama Castle
 Wakayama City Museum
 Wakayama Prefectural Museum
 Wakayama Prefecture Kii-fudoki-no-oka Museum of Archaeology and Folklore

Chūgoku

Tottori Prefecture

Registered museums & designated museum-equivalent facilities
 Kurayoshi Museum
 Tottori City Historical Museum
 Tottori Folk Crafts Museum
 Tottori Prefectural Museum
 Watanabe Art Museum
 Yonago City Museum of Art

Museum-like facilities, etc
 Aoyakamiji Site Exhibition Hall
 Aoya Local Museum
 Aoyama Gōshō Furusatokan
 Aoya Washi Workshop
 Asia Museum - Inoue Yasushi Memorial Museum
 Chiisana Yume Art Museum
 Daisen-ji Hōmotsukan Reihōkaku
 Daisen Museum of Nature and History
 Enchō-en Chinese Garden
 Enkei Theater Kurayoshi Figure Museum
 Hiezu Village Folk Museum
 Hino Town Museum of History and Folklore
 Hōjō History and Folklore Museum
 Hōki Sangaku Art Museum
 Hyōnosen Nature Museum, Hibikinomori
 Ikemoto Yoshimi Little Museum Of Photography
 Inaba Man-yō History Pavilion
 Ishitani Residence
 Japan-Korea Friendship Museum
 Jinsho no Yakata
 Jinpūkaku
 Kameda Masakazu Memorial Museum
 Kamiyodo Hakuhō-no-Oka Exhibition Hall
 Kōfu Town Museum of History and Folklore
 Kotoura Lifelong Learning Center
 Kurayoshi Line Railway Memorial Museum
 Misasa Violin Museum
 Mizuki Shigeru Memorial Museum
 Mount Oshiroyama Observation Deck Kawahara Castle
 Nagashibina Doll Museum
 Nichinan Town Art Museum
 Nishikawa Katsumi Film Museum
 Saji Astro Park
 Mitokusan Sanbutsu-ji Treasure Hall
 Sand Museum
 San'in Kaigan Geopark Museum of the Earth and Sea
 Shiotani Teikō Memorial Photo Gallery
 Tottori College Kasuri Museum
 Tottori Hanakairō Flower Park
 Tottori Nijisseiki Pear Museum
 Tottori Prefectural Buried Cultural Property Center
 Tottori Prefectural Muki Banda Historic Site Park
 Ueda Shōji Museum of Photography
 Umi to Kurashi no Shiryōkan
 Wakasa Kyōdo Bunka-no-Sato
 Warabekan
 Yonago City Fukuichi Archaeology Museum
 Municipal Yonago Historical Museum
 Yonago San'in Historical Museum
 Yonago Waterbirds Sanctuary
 Yukamuri Gallery - Osaki Midori Museum
 Yumeminato Tower
 Yurihama Town Hawai History and Folklore Museum
 Yūsei Museum

Shimane

Registered museums & designated museum-equivalent facilities
 Abe Eishirō Memorial Museum
 Adachi Museum of Art
 Hamada Children's Museum of Art
 Hirata Honjin Memorial Museum
 Imaoka Art Museum
 Itohara Memorial Museum
 Iwami Adachi Art Museum
 Iwami Art Museum
 Izumo Taisha Hōmotsuden
 Kabeya Shūseikan
 Kamei History Hall
 Kanō Art Museum
 Matsue History Museum
 Sekishō Art Museum
 Shimane Art Museum
 Shimane Museum of Ancient Izumo
 Tanabe Art Museum
 Tezen Museum
 Wakō Museum

Museum-like facilities, etc
 Ama Town Gotobain Museum
 Anno Mitsumasa Art Museum
 Hamada Local History Museum
 Hanzake Nature Museum of Mizuho
 Imai Museum
 Iwami Ginzan Museum
 Izumo Cultural Heritage Museum
 Izumo Folk Crafts Museum
 Izumo Science Center
 Izumo Tamatsukuri Museum
 Izumo Yayoi-no-Mori Museum
 Kōjindani Archaeological Museum
 Lafcadio Hearn Memorial Museum
 Matsue Castle
 Nakamura Hajime Memorial Museum
 Nima Sand Museum
 Oki Kyōdokan
 Okuizumo Tane Museum of Natural History
 Okuizumo Tatara Sword Museum
 Sanbe-Azukihara Buried Forest Park
 Sesshū Memorial Museum
 Shimane Prefectural Sanbe Nature Museum Sahimeru
 Shimane Prefectural Yakumotatsu Fudoki-no-Oka Museum
 Tsuwano Japan Heritage Centre
 Yunotsu Yakimono no Sato

Okayama
 Bizen Traditional Industry Hall, located in Imbe Station 
 Okayama Prefecture Bizen Ceramics Museum
 Hayashibara Museum of Art
 Kawasaki Medical School
 Nagi Museum Of Contemporary Art
 Ohara Museum of Art
 Okayama Castle
 Okayama Orient Museum
 Okayama Prefectural Museum
 Okayama Prefectural Museum of Art
 Tsuyama Railroad Educational Museum
 Yumeji Art Museum

Hiroshima Prefecture

Registered museums
As of 31 January 2019, and in line with the Museum Act, there were twenty-eight registered museums in Hiroshima Prefecture:
 Akitakata City History and Folk Museum
 Fukuyama Auto & Clock Museum
 Fukuyama Castle Museum
 Fukuyama City Shinichi Museum of History and Folklore
 Fukuyama Museum of Art
 Hirayama Ikuo Museum of Art
 Hiroshima Castle
 Hiroshima Children's Museum
 Hiroshima City Ebayama Museum of Meteorology
 Hiroshima City Museum of Contemporary Art
 Hiroshima City Museum of History and Traditional Crafts
 Hiroshima City Transportation Museum
 Hiroshima Museum of Art
 Hiroshima Prefectural Art Museum
 Hiroshima Prefectural History and Folklore Museum
 Hiroshima Prefectural Museum of History
 Hiwa Natural Science Museum
 Itsukushima Jinja Hōmotsukan
 Izumi Museum of Art
 Kōsan-ji Museum
 Kure Municipal Museum of Art
 Onomichi City Museum of Art
 Rai San'yō Historic Site Museum
 Shibuya Art Museum
 Taishaku Gorge Museum Jiyūkan
 Takehara Museum of Art
 Umi-Mori Art Museum
 Wood One Museum of Art

Designated museum-equivalent facilities
As of 31 January 2019, and in line with the Museum Act, there were five designated museum-equivalent facilities in Hiroshima Prefecture:
 Fude-no-Sato Kōbō
 Fukuyama City Zoo
 Hiroshima City Asa Zoological Park
 Hiroshima University Museum
 Miyajima Public Aquarium

Museum-like facilities, etc
 Atatajima Lighthouse Museum
 Fukuromachi Elementary School Peace Museum
 Fukuyama City Human Rights Peace Museum
 Fukuyama City Kannabe Historical Folklore Museum
 Fukuyama City Tomonoura Museum of History and Folklore
 Fukuyama Museum of Literature
 Health Sciences Museum
 Higashihiroshima City Museum of Art
 Hiroshima Botanical Garden
 Hiroshima Peace Memorial Museum
 Hiroshima Teishin Hospital Former Outpatients Ward Exhibition Room
 Holocaust Education Center
 Hon'inbō Shūsaku Igo Memorial Museum
 Honkawa Elementary School Peace Museum
 Innoshima Flower Center
 Innoshima Suigun Castle
 Irifuneyama Memorial Museum
 Iroha-maru Tenjikan
 Japan Coast Guard Museum
 JMSDF Kure Museum
 Kuchiwa Historical Museum
 Matsunaga Footwear Museum
 Mazda Museum
 Nakagawa Art Museum
 Nakata Museum
 Okuda Gensō Sayume Art Museum
 Ōkunoshima Poison Gas Museum
 Onomichi Film Museum
 Onomichi Historical Museum
 Onomichi Mansion of Literature
 Yachiyo no Oka Museum of Art
 Yamato Museum

Former museums
 Glass Village (Garasu no Sato) Museum
 Japan Folk Toy & Doll Museum
 Japan Footwear Museum

Yamaguchi Prefecture

Registered museums & designated museum-equivalent facilities
 The Hagi Museum
 Hagi Uragami Museum
 Iwakuni Art Museum
 Iwakuni Chōkokan
 Kikkawa Historical Museum
 Kumaya Art Museum
 Mōri Museum
 Nomura Art Museum
 Shimonoseki City Archaeological Museum
 Shimonoseki City Art Museum
 Shimonoseki City Museum of History
 Shūnan City Museum of Art and History
 Yamaguchi Prefectural Museum
 Yamaguchi Prefectural Museum of Art
 Yoshika Taiba Memorial Museum

Museum-like facilities, etc
 Hoshino Tetsurō Museum
 Kaiten Memorial Museum
 Murata Seifū Memorial Museum
 Museum of Japanese Emigration to Hawaii
 Mutsu Memorial Museum
 Nakahara Chūya Memorial Museum
 Ube Tokiwa Museum
 Yamaguchi Prefectural Government Museum

Shikoku

Tokushima Prefecture

Registered museums & designated museum-equivalent facilities
 Hall of Awa Japanese Handmade Paper
 Matsushige Town Museum of History and Folklore - Ningyō Jōruri Theater Museum
 Ōtsuka Museum of Art
 Tokushima Archaeological Museum
 Tokushima Castle Museum
 Tokushima Modern Art Museum
 Tokushima Prefectural Museum
 Tokushima Prefectural Torii Ryūzō Memorial Museum

Museum-like facilities, etc
 Ai no Yakata
 Aioi Shinrin Museum of Art
 Ataka Museum of Art
 Anan Awa Kubō Folk Museum
 Awa City Donari Historical Museum
 Awa Ikeda Tobacco Museum - Awa Ikeda Udatsu House
 Awa Odori Kaikan
 Heike Yashiki Museum of Folklore
 Hiwasa Chelonian Museum Caretta
 Kagawa Toyohiko Memorial Museum
 Kaiyō Town Museum
 Kawata Folk Museum
 Mima Kyōdo Museum
 Misato Hotaru Museum
 Moraes Museum
 Naruto Galle No Mori Art Museum
 Naruto German House
 Ōnaruto Bridge Memorial Museum
 Sūō Art Museum
 Tokushima Botanical Garden
 Tokushima City Tenguhisa Museum
 Tokushima Prefectural Awa Jūrōbe Yashiki
 Tokushima Prefectural Buried Cultural Properties Research Centre
 Tokushima Prefectural Museum of Literature and Calligraphy
 Tokushima Science Museum
 Tokushima War Dead Memorial Museum

Kagawa Prefecture

Registered museums & designated museum-equivalent facilities
 Chichū Art Museum
 Isamu Noguchi Garden Museum
 The Kagawa Museum
 Kamada Museum
 Kotohira-gū Museum
 Shikoku Mura
 Takamatsu Art Museum
 Takamatsu City Stone Folk Museum
 Takamatsu Historical Museum

Museum-like facilities, etc
In addition to the above, the following are member museums of the :
 Araki Kazuo Memorial Folk Tool Museum (Sanuki Senshintei)* Ayagawa Lifelong Learning Center
 Henro Exchange Salon
 Higashikagawa City History and Folk Museum
 Hiraga Gennai Memorial Museum
 Ibukijima Folk History Museum
 Kagawa Glove Museum
 Kagawa Memorial Water Park Water Museum
 Kagawa Prefectural Goshikidai Children's Nature Center
 Kan'onji City Museum
 Kinryō-no-Sato Sake Museum
 Kotohira Town History and Folklore Museum
 Local Doll Museum
 Marugame Museum
 Marukin Soy Sauce Museum
 Mitoyo City Takuma Town Folk Museum
 Mount Shiude Archaeological Museum
 Sakaide City Museum
 Sakaide City Salt Industry Museum
 Sanuki City History and Folk Museum
 Sanuki Kokubun-ji Site Museum
 Sea Science Museum
 Seto Inland Sea Folk History Museum
 Seto Ōhashi Memorial Museum
 Sōkichi Kawara no Sato Exhibition Hall
 Tadotsu Town Museum
 Takamatsu City Kōnan History and Folk Museum
 Takamatsu Suidō Museum
 Toramaru Puppet Theater Museum
 Toyohama Folk Museum (Cotton Museum)
 Ushiyaguchi Shūkokan
 Utazu industrial Museum
 World Coin Museum
 Yoshima Museum
 Zentsūji City Local Folk Museum

Other related facilities include:
 Benesse Art Site Naoshima
 Benesse House
 George Nakashima Memorial Gallery
 Kagawa Prefectural Higashiyama Kaii Setouchi Art Museum
 Lee Ufan Museum
 Marugame Art Museum
 Marugame Castle
 Marugame Hirai Art Museum
 Marugame Inokuma Genichirō Museum of Contemporary Art
 Marugame Uchiwa no Minato Museum
 Museum of JGSDF Camp Zentsuji
 Ozaki Hōsai Memorial Museum
 Teshima Art Museum
 Teshima Yokoo House
 Tsuboi Sakae Museum of Literature

Ehime Prefecture

Registered museums
As of 1 April 2020, and in line with the Museum Act, there were eighteen registered museums in Ehime Prefecture:
 Ehime Bunkakan
 Ehime Mingeikan
 Ehime Prefectural Science Museum
 Ikata Town Museum
 Itami Jūzō Memorial Museum
 Murakami Kaizoku Museum (also referred to as the Murakami Suigun Museum)
 The Museum of Art, Ehime
 Museum of Ehime History and Culture
 Niihama City Museum of Art
 Ōmishima Maritime Museum
 Ōmishima Museum of Art Honkan
 Ōmishima Museum of Art Annex: Iwata Ken Mother and Child Museum, Imabari City
 Ōmishima Museum of Art Annex: Tokoro Museum Ōmishima
 Ōyamazumi Jinja Hōmotsukan
 Ōzu City Museum
 Shiki Memorial Museum
 Tōon City Museum of History and Folklore
 Uwajima City Date Museum

Designated museum-equivalent facilities
As of 1 April 2020, and in line with the Museum Act, there were six designated museum-equivalent facilities in Ehime Prefecture:
 Kuma Museum of Art
 Hirose Memorial Museum
 Saijō City Saijō Folk Museum
 Saka no Ue no Kumo Museum
 Takabatake Kashō Taishō Roman-kan
 Tobe Zoological Park of Ehime Prefecture

Museum-like facilities, etc
 Akagane Museum
 Besshi Copper Mine Memorial Museum
 Ehime Prefectural Lifelong Learning Center
 Ehime University Museum
 Higurashi Villa Memorial Museum
 Ikazaki Kite Museum
 Imabari City Kōno Museum of Art
 Itō Toyoo Museum of Architecture, Imabari
 Kaimei School
 Kawara-kan
 Kubota Palm Garden
 Matsuyama Archaeological Museum
 Murakami Santō Memorial Museum
 Omogo Mountain Museum
 Paper Museum
 Railway History Park, Saijō
 Shikokuchūō City Museum of History and Archaeology
 Tamagawa Museum of Modern Art, Imabari
 Tobe Ware Traditional Industry Hall
 Towel Museum Ichihiro
 Uwajima City Historical Museum

Kōchi Prefecture

Registered museums & designated museum-equivalent facilities
 Aki City Calligraphy Museum
 Aki City Museum of History and Folklore
 Kami City Art Museum
 Kami City Takashi Yanase Memorial Hall & Anpanman Museum
 Kochi Liberty and People's Rights Museum
 Kōchi Prefectural Museum of History
 The Museum of Art, Kōchi
 Ryūga Cave Museum
 Sakawa Town Aoyama Bunko
 Sukumo City History Museum
 Yokoyama Memorial Manga Museum

Museum-like facilities, etc
 Ekin Museum
 Former Yamauchi Residence
 Ino Paper Museum
 Kōchi Castle
 Kōchi Castle Museum of History
 Kōchi Literary Museum
 Makino Botanical Garden
 Ryōma's Birthplace Memorial Museum
 Sakamoto Ryōma Memorial Museum
 Tosa Yamauchi Family Treasury and Archives
 Yanase Takashi Memorial Hall
 Yokokurayama Natural Forest Museum
 Yoshii Isamu Memorial Museum
 Zuizan Memorial Museum

Kyushu

Fukuoka
 Fukuoka Art Museum
 Fukuoka City Museum
 Fukuoka Oriental Ceramics Museum
 Fukuoka Prefectural Museum of Art
 Gorōyama kofun
 Idemitsu Museum of Arts
 Itokoku History Museum
 Kitakyushu Municipal Museum of Art
 Kitakyushu Museum of Natural History & Human History
 Kokura Castle
 Kubote Historical Museum
 Kurume City Art Museum
 Kyushu Historical Museum
 Kyushu National Museum
 Matsumoto Seichō Memorial Museum
 Tachiarai Peace Memorial Museum

Saga Prefecture

Registered museums & designated museum-equivalent facilities
 Arita Ceramic Art Museum
 Arita Porcelain Park
 Chōkokan
 Imaemon Museum of Ceramic Antiques
 Kawamura Art Museum
 Kyūshū Ceramic Museum
 Nakatomi Memorial Medicine Museum
 Saga Castle History Museum
 Saga Prefectural Art Museum
 Saga Prefectural Museum
 Saga Prefectural Nagoya Castle Museum
 Yōkō Art Museum
 Yūtoku Museum

Museum-like facilities, etc
 Arita Folk and History Museum East Building & Arita Ware Reference Museum
 Fukagawa Porcelain China On The Park Chūjikan
 Genkai Town Museum of History and Folklore
 Imari City Ceramic Merchants Museum
 Imari History and Folklore Museum
 Imari-Nabeshima Gallery
 Kamimine Town Furusato Gakkan
 Karatsu Castle
 Karatsu City Kodai no Mori Kaikan
 Kashima City Folk Museum
 Kōhoku Town Museum
 Matsurokan
 Muraoka Sōhonpo Yōkan Museum
 Nakabayashi Gochiku Memorial Museum
 Ogi City Historical Museum
 Ōkuma Shigenobu Memorial Museum
 Saga City History and Folklore Museum
 Saga Prefecture Agricultural Research Center Museum
 Saga Prefecture Space and Science Museum
 Saga University Art Museum
 Sano Tsunetami Memorial Museum
 Shida Ware Museum
 Taihei-an Sake Brewery Museum
 Takeo City Library and History Museum
 Taku City Museum
 Tara Town Museum of History and Folklore
 Ureshino City Museum of History and Folklore
 Yoshinogari site Yayoi Life Museum

Nagasaki Prefecture

Registered museums & designated museum-equivalent facilities
 Confucius Shrine & Historical Museum of China
 Huis Ten Bosch Museums
 Iki City Ikikoku Museum
 Ikitsuki Island Museum, Shima no Yakata
 Matsura Historical Museum
 Nagasaki Junshin Catholic University Museum
 Nagasaki Museum of History and Culture
 Nagasaki Prefectural Art Museum
 Sasebo City Museum, Shimase Art Center
 Shin-Kamigotō Geihinkan Museum
 Unzen Vidro Museum

Museum-like facilities, etc
 Endō Shūsaku Literary Museum
 Glover Garden
 Gunkanjima Museum
 Former Hong Kong and Shanghai Banking Nagasaki Branch Memorial Multi-Purpose Hall
 Gotō Kankō History Museum
 Hirado Castle
 Hirado Dutch Trading Post
 Hirado Kirishitan Museum
 Inori-no-Oka Picture Book Museum
 Kamitsushima Town Museum of History and Folklore
 Matsunaga Yasuzaemon Memorial Museum
 Matsuura City Buried Cultural Property Center
 MDSF Sasebo History Museum
 Mine Town Museum of History and Folklore
 Mitsubishi Heavy Industries Nagasaki Shipyard & Machinery Works Historical Museum
 Mount Unzen Disaster Memorial Hall
 Nagasaki Atomic Bomb Museum
 Nagasaki City Bekkō Crafts Museum
 Nagasaki City Father de Rotz Memorial Museum
 Nagasaki City Iōjima Lighthouse Memorial Museum
 Nagasaki City Kameyama Shachū Memorial Museum
 Nagasaki City Maizō Shiryōkan
 Nagasaki City Museum of History and Folklore
 Nagasaki City Noguchi Yatarō Memorial Museum of Art
 Nagasaki City Old Photograph Museum
 Nagasaki City Science Museum
 Nagasaki City Sotome Museum of History and Folklore
 Nagasaki City Takashima Coal Museum
 Nagasaki National Peace Memorial Hall for the Atomic Bomb Victims
 Nagasaki Peace Museum
 Nagasaki Prefectural Tsushima Museum of History and Folklore
 Santo Domingo Church Museum
 Satotabaru Museum of History and Folklore
 Shimabara Castle
 Shimizu Kon Exhibition Hall (Nakano Chaya)
 Siebold Memorial Museum
 Suka Gogodō Art Museum
 Toyotama Museum
 Tsushima Museum
 Twenty-Six Martyrs Museum and Monument

Former facilities
 Nagasaki Subtropical Botanical Garden

Kumamoto Prefecture

Registered museums & designated museum-equivalent facilities
 Honmyō-ji Hōmotsukan
 Hoshino Tomihiro Museum of Art, Ashikita
 Kikuchi Shrine Historical Museum
 Kumamoto City Museum
 Kumamoto International Folk Craft Museum
 Kumamoto Prefectural Ancient Burial Mound Museum
 Kumamoto Prefectural Museum of Art
 Kumamoto University Memorial Museum of the Fifth High School
 Matsui Bunko Museum Kisai
 Shimada Museum of Arts
 Shinpūren Museum
 Tamana City Historical Museum Kokoropia
 Yamaga City Museum
 Yatsushiro City Museum Future Forest Museum
 Yunomae Manga Museum

Museum-like facilities, etc
 Amakusa Archives
 Amakusa Christian Museum
 Amakusa City Itsuwa Museum of History and Folklore
 Amakusa Collegio Museum
 Amakusa Rosary Museum
 Arao City Miyazaki Brothers Museum
 Arao Cultural Center & Children's Science Museum
 Aso Volcano Museum
 Contemporary Art Museum, Kumamoto
 Goshoura Cretaceous Museum
 Gotō Zezan Memorial Museum
 Higo no Satoyama Gallery
 Hondo Museum of History and Folklore
 Inukai Memorial Museum of Art
 Itsuki Village History and Culture Exchange Center, Historia Terrace Itsukidani
 The Janes' Residence, Kumamoto
 Kitasato Shibasaburō Memorial Museum
 Kiyoura Memorial Museum
 Koizumi Yakumo Former Residence in Kumamoto
 Kōshi City Kōshi Historical Museum
 Kōshi City Nishi-Gōshi Historical Museum
 Kumamoto City Tabaruzaka Seinan Civil War Museum
 Kumamoto City Tsukahara Historical Museum,
 Kumamoto City Water Science Museum
 Kumamoto City Zoological and Botanic Gardens
 Kumamoto Museum of History and Literature
 Kumamoto Prefectural Traditional Arts Center
 Kyūsendō Forest Museum
 Matsumae Shigeyoshi Memorial Museum
 Mifune Dinosaur Museum
 Minamata Disease Museum
 Minamiaso Luna Observatory
 Nagomi Town Museum of History and Folklore
 Natsume Sōseki Former Residence in Uchitsuboimachi
 Newspaper Museum
 Ōzu Town Museum of History and Cultural Tradition
 Reihoku History Museum
 Riddell-Wright Memorial Hall
 Sakamoto Zenzō Museum of Art
 Seiwa Bunraku Museum
 Shiken Fujin Memorial Museum
 Sohō Memorial Museum
 Tsunagi Art Museum
 Tokutomi Memorial Garden
 Uki City Shiranuhi Museum (cf. shiranui)
 Yamae Village History and Folklore Museum
 Yamaga Lantern Folk Craft Museum
 Yokoi Shōnan Memorial Museum

Ōita Prefecture

Registered museums 
As of 1 April 2020, and in line with the Museum Act, there were five registered museums in Ōita Prefecture:
 Kunisaki City Historical Learning Centre
 Nakatsu History Museum
 Nikaidō Museum of Art
 Ōita City Art Museum
 Ōita Prefectural Museum of History

Designated museum-equivalent facilities 
As of 1 April 2020, and in line with the Museum Act, there were ten designated museum-equivalent facilities in Ōita Prefecture:
 Beppu University Museum
 Hirose Museum
 Hita City Museum
 Kurushima Takehiko Memorial Hall
 Kyūshū Natural Animal Park African Safari
 Ōita Fragrance Museum
 Ōita Marine Palace Aquarium "Umitamago"
 Ōita Prefectural Art Museum
 Ōita Prefecture Ancient Sages Historical Archives
 Yabakei Museum

Museum-like facilities, etc 
In addition to the above, the following facilities are member museums of the :
 Asakura Fumio Memorial Museum
 Beppu City Art Museum
 Bungo-Ōno City Museum of History and Folklore
 Hiroike Chikurō Memorial Museum
 Kitsuki Castle Town Museum
 Miura Baien Museum, Kunisaki
 Nakatsu Castle
 Nakatsu City Museum of History and Folklore
 Ōita City Historical Museum
 Ōita Takasaki-yama Natural Wildlife Park
 Taketa City Historical Museum
 Usa Jingū Hōmotsukan

Other facilities include:
 Ama Kofun Shiryōkan
 Beppu Art Museum
 Comico Art Museum Yufuin
 Nogami Yaeko Memorial Museum of Literature
 Nada-gū Hōmotsukan
 Ōita Kenritsu Geijutsu Kaikan
 Saiki History Museum
 Sano Botanical Garden
 Tenryō Hita Museum
 Yufuin Modern Art Museum
 Yufuin Retro Motor Museum

Miyazaki Prefecture

Registered museums & designated museum-equivalent facilities
 Miyakonojō City Museum of Art
 Miyazaki Prefectural Art Museum
 Miyazaki Prefectural Museum of Nature and History
 Saitobaru Archaeological Museum of Miyazaki Prefecture
 Shiiba Folk Arts Museum
 Takanabe Museum of Art

Museum-like facilities, etc
 Agricultural Museum, University of Miyazaki Faculty of Agriculture
 Aoshima Subtropical Botanical Garden
 Aya International Craft Castle
 Ebino History and Folklore Museum
 Former Yoshimatsu Family Residence
 Gokase Town Museum of the Blessings of Nature
 Hyūga City History and Folk Museum
 Hyūga City Hososhima Port Museum
 Ishii Jūji Shiryōkan
 Kadogawa History and Folk Museum
 Kunitomi Sōgō Bunka Kaikan
 Miyakonojō History Museum
 Miyakonojō Shimazu Residence
 Miyazaki Art Center
 Miyazaki City Museum of History & Ikime-no-Mori Yūkokan
 Miyazaki Jingū Chōkokan
 Miyazaki Prefectural Buried Cultural Property Center
 Miyazaki Science Center
 Morotsuka Folk Museum
 Naitō Memorial Museum
 Nishimera Museum of History and Folklore
 Nobeoka Botanical Garden
 Nojiri Museum of History and Folklore
 Obi Castle History Museum
 Ōyodo River Study Center
 Saito City Museum of History and Folklore
 Takachiho Community Center
 Takanabe Town Museum of History
 Wakayama Bokusui Memorial Museum of Literature
 Yasui Sokken Memorial Museum

Former museums
 Miyazaki Museum of History and Culture

Kagoshima Prefecture

Registered museums & designated museum-equivalent facilities
 Harano Agricultural Museum
 Ibusuki Archaeological Museum, Jiyūkan Cocco Hashimure
 The International University of Kagoshima Faculty of Intercultural Studies Museum of Archaeology
 Iwasaki Art Museum
 Jigen-ryū Swordsmanship Museum
 Kagoshima City Modern Literature Museum & Kagoshima City Märchen Fairy Tale Museum
 Kagoshima City Museum of Art
 Kagoshima Prefectural Museum
 Kagoshima University Museum
 Kodama Museum of Art
 Matsushita Museum of Art
 Miyake Museum of Art
 Nagashima Museum
 Nakamura Shinya Art Museum
 Reimeikan, Kagoshima Prefectural Center for Historical Material
 Shōko Shūseikan
 Yoshii Junji Art Museum
 Yōzan Museum of Art

Museum-like facilities, etc
As of 20 June 2019, other than the above, the following were members of the :
 Aira City History and Folk Museum
 Akune City History Museum
 Amami City Amami Museum (also a member museum of Okinawa Prefecture Museum Society)
 Amami City Museum of History and Folklore (member museum of Okinawa Prefecture Museum Society)
 Amami Park (Amami no Sato, Tanaka Isson Memorial Museum of Art)
 Chin Jukan Museum
 Flower Park Kagoshima
 Hioki City Fukiage Museum of History and Folklore
 Hirota Site Museum & Park
 History Museum Kimpō, Minamisatsuma City
 Isen Town Museum of History and Folklore
 Ishibashi Park & Memorial Hall
 Izumi City Crane Museum, Crane Park Izumi
 Izumi City History and Folk Museum
 Izumi Fumoto History Museum
 Japan Mandarin Orange Center
 Kagoshima Aquarium
 Kagoshima City Hirakawa Zoological Park
 Kagoshima City Museum of Archaeology
 Kagoshima Immaculate Heart University Museum
 Kagoshima Municipal Science Hall
 Kagoshima Women's Junior College Museum
 Kasasa Art Museum, Minamisatsuma (Kurose Lookout Museum)
 Kasasa Ebisu
 Kihoku Historical Folk Museum, Kanoya City
 Kimotsuki Museum of History and Folklore
 Kirishima City Hayato Museum of History and Folklore
 Kirishima Open Air Museum
 Kirishima Kokubu Museum of History
 Kishinkan, Bōnotsu Center for Historical Material
 Makurazaki Nanmeikan Cultural Resource Center
 Minamisatsuma Municipal Museum on Kaseda Local History
 Minamitane Town Museum
 Miyanojō Historical Center, Satsuma
 Muku Hatojū Memorial Museum of Literature
 Museum Chiran
 Museum of the Meiji Restoration
 Nagashima Town Museum of History and Folklore
 Nakatane Town Museum of History and Folklore
 Saigō Nanshū Memorial Museum
 Sakurajima Visitor Center
 Satsuma Denshōkan
 Satsuma Students Museum
 Satsumasendai History Museum
 Satsumasendai Magokoro Museum of Literature
 Setouchi Town Library & Setouchi Municipal Museum (also a member museum of Okinawa Prefecture Museum Society)
 Shibushi City Buried Cultural Property Center
 Sueyoshi Museum of History and Folklore, Soo City
 Tanegashima Akagome Museum
 Tanegashima Development Center
 Tokunoshima Town Museum
 Uenohara Jōmon no Mori
 Wadomari Town Museum of History and Folklore (also a member museum of Okinawa Prefecture Museum Society)
 Yakushima Environmental and Cultural Village Center
 Yakushima Town History and Folk Museum
 Yakusugi Museum

In addition to the above, the following facilities are in Kagoshima Prefecture:
 Bansei Tokkō Peace Museum
 Chiran Peace Museum for Kamikaze Pilots
 Ei Museum of History and Folklore, Minamikyūshū
 Kanoya Air Base Museum
 Kihoku Astronomical Museum
 Kirishima City Museum of History and Folklore
 Little Miyata Museum
 Nansatsu Railway Museum
 Nihonga Memorial Museum of Art, Sōbun
 Sakurajima International Volcanic Sabō Center
 Sendai Space Hall
 Yokogawa Museum of History and Traditional Crafts, Kirishima

Okinawa Prefecture

Registered museums
As of 1 May 2018, and in line with the Museum Act, there were eleven registered museums in Okinawa Prefecture:
 Ginowan City Museum
 Himeyuri Peace Museum
 Ishigaki City Yaeyama Museum
 Kumejima Museum
 Miyakojima City Museum
 Nago Museum
 Naha Municipal Tsuboya Pottery Museum
 Okinawa Churaumi Aquarium
 Okinawa Municipal Museum
 Okinawa Prefectural Museum & Art Museum
 Urasoe Art Museum

Designated museum-equivalent facilities 
As of 1 May 2018, and in line with the Museum Act, there were six designated museum-equivalent facilities in Okinawa Prefecture:
 Haebaru Culture Center
 Okinawa Kodomo Future Zone
 Okinawa World
 Southeast Botanical Gardens
 Ryūkyū University Museum (Fūju-kan)
 Tsushima-maru Memorial Museum

Museum-like facilities, etc 
In addition to the above, and as of 1 May 2018, the Okinawa Prefectural Government lists the following facilities:
 Anti-War Peace Museum (Nuchi du Takara no Ie)
 Ayamihabiru Museum
 Butterfly Museum Kabira
 Former Navy Headquarters
 Ginoza Village Museum
 Higashi Village Mountain and Water Life Museum
 Iheya Village History and Folk Museum
 Iriomote Wildlife Conservation Center
 Ishigaki Island Limestone Cave
 Ishigaki Yaima Mura
 Izena Fureai Folk Museum
 Kihō-in Shūshūkan
 Kohama Folk Museum
 Kumejima Firefly Museum
 Kumejima Sea Turtle Museum
 Kumejima-tsumugi no Sato, Yuimāru-kan
 Kadena Folk Material Hall
 Kuroshima Research Station
 Manko Waterbird & Wetland Center
 Mekaru Family Residence
 Minamidaitō Furusato Culture Center
 Minamidaitō Visitor Center Shima Marugoto Museum
 Minsa Weaving Craft Hall
 Miyakojima City Tropical Plant Garden
 Miyakojima Kaihōkan
 Old Miyaradunchi
 Moromi Folkcraft Museum
 Motobu Town Museum
 Mukashi-kan
 Naha City Museum of History
 Naha City Traditional Arts and Craft Center
 Nakamura Family Residence
 Nakijin Village History and Culture Center
 Neo Park Okinawa
 Nantō Folk Musem
 Oceanic Culture Museum
 Ōhama Nobumoto Memorial Museum
 Okinawa City Street Corner Data Hall
 Okinawa Nature School Museum
 Okinawa Peace Hall
 Okinawa Postal Material Center
 Okinawa Prefectural Buried Cultural Property Center
 Okinawa Prefectural Peace Memorial Museum
 Omoro Botanical Garden
 Onna Village Museum
 Ryūkyū Black Pearl Center
 Ryūkyū Shimpō Newspaper Museum
 Ryukyu Village
 Sakima Art Museum
 Satake Yaeyama Palm Memorial Museum
 Shimamuraya Sightseeing Park Folk Museum
 Shuri Castle Park
 Shuri Ryūsen Traditional Craft Museum
 Tarama Village Furusato Minzoku Gakushūkan
 Tokashiki Village History and Folk Heritage Museum
 Tomigusuku City History and Folk Material Exhibition Room
 Tropical & Subtropical Arboretum
 Tropical Dream Center
 Ueno German Culture Village Kinder House
 Uezu Family Residence
 Uruma City Ishikawa History and Folk Museum
 Uruma City Sea Culture Museum
 Uruma City Yonashiro History and Folk Museum
 Yaese Town Gushikami Museum of History and Folklore
 Yaeyama Peace Memorial Museum
 Yambaru Wildlife Conservation Center, Ufugi Nature Museum
 Yomitan Village Art Museum
 Yomitan Village History and Folklore Museum
 Yonabaru Town Tsunahiki Museum
 Yui Rail Exhibition Hall

In addition to the above, the following appear on the list of member museums of the :
 Eisa Museum
 Minamikaze Museum
 Nakagusuku Village Gosamaru Historical Materials Library
 National Theatre Okinawa
 Okinawa Army Hospital Haebaru Bunker No.20

References

See also

 Japanese museums
 Prefectural museum
 Tourism in Japan
 Culture of Japan
 List of museums

Lists of tourist attractions in Japan
 
Japan
Lists of buildings and structures in Japan
Japan education-related lists
Japan